The Lake Châteauvert is located on the path of the Manouane River (La Tuque), at the west of Saint-Maurice River in the territory of La Tuque, in Mauricie, in Quebec, in Canada.

Toponymy 
The name "Lake Châteauvert" was recorded in December 5, 1968, at the Bank of place names of Commission de toponymie du Québec (Geographical Names Board of Québec)

Geography 
Located entirely in forest area, the lake is formed Châteauvert any length, in the north-south axis. It receives water by:
 West, the discharge of Lake Manouane, which receives its waters from Kempt Lake (Matawinie);
 Center-west, the discharge of "Kekeo River (La Tuque)";
 South, the river Mondonac which is fed by lakes Sincennes and Mondonac.

The outlet of Lake Châteauvert is the Manouane River (La Tuque) at the north end. A high-capacity dam owned by Hydro-Québec is located at the mouth. The dam built in 1952 (concrete-gravity type) has a height of 14 m and a retention height of 12.5 m. The catchment area of the dam is 456 km². Its holding capacity is 269,820,000 m³. This dam is designated "Manouance -C"

Coming from Wemotaci, a forest road crosses the Manouane River (La Tuque) at the top of the dam Manouane-C, and then moves to the west by the north shore of Lake Châteauvert.

See also 

 Manouane River (La Tuque)
 Saint-Maurice River
 Lake Manouane
 Kempt Lake (Matawinie)
 La Tuque
 Mauricie
 Manawan, Canadian Indian reserve

References 

Lakes of Mauricie
Landforms of La Tuque, Quebec